Burcot is a hamlet in Oxfordshire, England on the left bank of the River Thames, in the civil parish of Clifton Hampden. Until 1932, it lay in the civil parish of Dorchester.

Heritage
Burcot in the 17th century was an important trans-shipment point on the Thames. The river at that time had become almost unnavigable between Oxford and Burcot, so that goods for Oxford had to be unloaded at Burcot and taken on by road. This led in 1605 to the formation of the Oxford-Burcot Commission, with the task of improving navigation.

The village, lying mainly between the main road and the Thames, became a desirable Thames-side residential area in the late 19th century. Almost all the earlier housing was pulled down. The only survivors from before the Victorian era are the Grade II listed Old Cottage, thought to be Tudor, The Tudor Cottage and the 16th-century pub premises. No other building dates from before 1888. The poet laureate John Masefield lived at Burcote Brook from 1932 until his death in 1967. Shortly afterwards, the house burnt down and was replaced by a Cheshire Home, which is named after him.

Governance
The village belongs to Clifton Hampden and Burcot parish, whose population was recorded in the 2011 Census as 662. It has been part of the South Oxfordshire local-government district since Henley Rural District was incorporated into it in 1974.

Facilities
Burcot lies on the main road from Dorchester to Abingdon, now the A415. Bus services are confined to schooldays.

The village has a thatch-roofed pub, The Chequers, which has developed into a restaurant. The nearest retail facilities are at the shopping centre in Dorchester, less than two miles away.

The former school is now a private house. The nearest primary school and church are at Clifton Hampden. Burcot is home to the business that developed the search engine "Ask Jeeves".

References

Hamlets in Oxfordshire
Populated places on the River Thames
Inland navigations